Christel Noir is a French author, screenwriter and artist. She received the Prix Montalembert for her first novel La Confession des anges. She also wrote the script for the TV series based on the novel. She paints under the name Soÿ and her work has been shown in national and international exhibitions.

Bibliography
 Papa, j'ai encore raté l'amour (2004, with Julia Noir)
 La confession des anges (2011)
 La porte du secret (2015)

References

Year of birth missing (living people)
Living people
21st-century French writers
21st-century French women writers